Rathmel is an unincorporated community in Jefferson County, in the U.S. state of Pennsylvania.

History
Rathmal got its start as a mining community. A post office called Rathmel was established in 1883, and remained in operation until 1930.

References

Unincorporated communities in Jefferson County, Pennsylvania
Unincorporated communities in Pennsylvania